The Perfect Furlough is a 1958 American CinemaScope Eastmancolor romantic comedy film directed by Blake Edwards and written by Stanley Shapiro. Edwards and Shapiro would re-team the following year for another Tony Curtis service comedy, Operation Petticoat.

Plot
The army has a problem with over 100 male soldiers stationed at an isolated Arctic base for nearly a year are having psychological problems due to their isolation. As a result, they have lost a sense of military discipline, are careless and lackadaisical in their duties and their morale is at rock bottom. As it is impossible to give all the soldiers a furlough, their commanding general in the US holds a meeting to discuss the best solution. Army psychiatrist Lieutenant Vicky Loren suggests that the soldiers on the isolated base decide amongst themselves what would be "the perfect furlough" with a lottery being held where one lucky soldier would go on the furlough with the rest of the soldiers living vicariously through him. They decide on a trip to Paris with sex symbol movie star Sandra Roca.

The scheming Corporal Paul Hodges wins the lottery and gets to Paris, France, on a three weeks' leave. The army is worried that Hodges' reputation as a ladies' man will embarrass the army if he has his way with the film star. Lt. Loren and two military policemen keep Hodges under constant supervision, but Hodges schemes to score with Sandra.

Cast
 Tony Curtis as Cpl. Paul Hodges
 Janet Leigh as Lt. Vicki Loren
 Keenan Wynn as Harvey Franklin
 Linda Cristal as Sandra Roca, the Argentine Bombshell 
 Elaine Stritch as Liz Baker
 Marcel Dalio as Henri Valentin
 Les Tremayne as Col. Leland
 Jay Novello as Rene Valentin
 King Donovan as Maj. Collins
 Gordon Jones as "Sylvia", MP #1
 Alvy Moore as Pvt. Marvin Brewer
 Lilyan Chauvin as French nurse
 Troy Donahue as Sgt. Nickles
 Dick Crockett as Hans, MP #2
 Eugene Borden as French doctor
 James Lanphier as assistant hotel manager

See also
 List of American films of 1958

References

External links
 
 
 

1958 films
1958 romantic comedy films
American romantic comedy films
1950s French-language films
Films set in Paris
Films directed by Blake Edwards
Universal Pictures films
Films scored by Frank Skinner
1950s English-language films
1950s American films